Luwingu District is a district of Zambia, located in Northern Province. The capital lies at Luwingu. As of the 2000 Zambian Census, the district had a population of 80,758 people.

References

Districts of Northern Province, Zambia